Johan is a Scandinavian and Dutch form of Iohannes, the Latin form of the Greek name Iōánnēs, from the Hebrew name Yochanan, itself derived from the extended form , meaning "Yahweh is Gracious". It is uncommon as a surname. Its English equivalent is John. 

Johan is also a masculine given name of Malay language origin, meaning "champion".

People with the name Johan include:

First name 
 Johan (Archbishop of Uppsala), late 13th-century Polish-born cleric
 Johan Alho (1907–1982), Finnish footballer and a football referee
 Johan Andersson (born 1974), Swedish video game designer
 Johan Berisha (born 1979), Swiss footballer
 Johan Bleeker (born 1942), Dutch space scientist
 Johan Bouma (born 1940), Dutch soil scientist
 Johan Brunell (born 1991), Finnish footballer
 Johan Bruyneel (born 1964), Belgian cyclist and team manager
 Johan Büser (born 1983), Swedish politician
 Johan Christian Fabricius (1745–1808), Danish zoologist
 Johan Cruyff (1947–2016) Dutch football manager and retired player
 Ole-Johan Dahl (1931–2002), Norwegian computer scientist 
 Johan Derksen (born 1949), Dutch sports journalist and former football player
 Johan Edlund (born 1971), Swedish musician, leader and vocalist of the band Tiamat
 Johan Frandsen (born 1982), frontman for Swedish band, The Knockouts
 Johan Galtung (born 1930), Norwegian sociologist
 Johan Harmenberg (born 1954), Swedish Olympic champion épée fencer
 Johan Hansing (1888–1941), Estonian lawyer, stage actor, playwright, and politician
 Johan Håstad (born 1960), Swedish mathematician
 Johan Hegg, Vocalist for the melodic death metal band, Amon Amarth
 Johan Gustaf Hellsten (1870–1956), Finnish president
 Johan Hjort (1869–1948), Norwegian fisheries biologist, marine zoologist, and oceanographer
 Johan Kenkhuis (born 1980), Dutch swimmer
 Johan Kõpp (1874–1970), Estonian Lutheran bishop 
 Johan Kristoffersson (born 1988), Swedish race-car driver
 Johan Ludvig Runeberg (1804–1877), Finland-Swedish poet
 Johan Micoud (born 1973), French footballer
 Johan van Minnen (1932–2016), Dutch journalist and politician
 Johan Munters (born 1978), Swedish ski jumper
 Johan Museeuw (born 1965), Belgian cyclist 
 Johan Neeskens (born 1951), Dutch soccer player 
 Johan Norberg (born 1973), Swedish writer
 Johan Pitka (1872–1944), Estonian military commander
 Johan of Plön (died 1359), lord of Denmark east of the Great Belt
 Johan Oscar Smith (1871–1943 Horten). Norwegian Christian leader, founder of Brunstad Christian Church
 Johan Raid (1885–1964), Estonian politician and civil servant
 Johan Reinholdz (born 1980), Swedish guitar player in Andromeda, NonExist and Skyfire
 Johan Renck (born 1966), Swedish director 
 Johann Rupert (born 1950), South African businessman
 Johan Santana (born 1979), American baseball player
 Johan Staël von Holstein (born 1963), Swedish entrepreneur
 Johan Gabriel Ståhlberg (1832–1873), Finnish priest, the father of President K. J. Ståhlberg
 Johan Svensson (born 1962), Swedish Air Force officer
 Johan Teterissa (1961–2019), Indonesian activist
 Johan Thyrén (1861–1933), Swedish academic and politician 
 Johan van der Velde (born 1956), Dutch cyclist
 Johan Vonlanthen (born 1986), Swiss football player
 Johan Wallberg (born 1977), Swedish freestyle swimmer
 Johan Josef "John" Willis (born 1952), American-Israeli basketball player
 Johan Zulch de Villiers (1845–1910), South African politician

Middle name 
 Carl Johan Trygg, (1887–1954), Swedish master woodcarver
 Count Carl Johan Bernadotte of Wisborg (1916–2012), youngest child of King Gustaf VI Adolf of Sweden

Surname 
 Syahredzan Johan (born 1983), Malaysian politician

Other uses 
 Johan Liebert, a character from Monster (manga)

See also 
 John (given name)
 Johann
 Johannes
 Alternate forms for the name John

Given names
Danish masculine given names
Dutch masculine given names
Norwegian masculine given names
Scandinavian masculine given names
Swedish masculine given names